Kazimierz Bocheński (12 May 1910 – May 1940) was a Polish freestyle swimmer. He competed in the men's 4 × 200 metre freestyle relay at the 1936 Summer Olympics. He was murdered in a prisoner of war camp in World War II.

References

External links
 

1910 births
1940 deaths
Polish male freestyle swimmers
Olympic swimmers of Poland
Swimmers at the 1936 Summer Olympics
People from Nisko County
Sportspeople from Podkarpackie Voivodeship
Polish military personnel killed in World War II
20th-century Polish people